Shereveer Vakil is an Indian actor and gym trainer. Vakil had worked in many films such as James (2005) and Welcome (2007) and he had played a villain role in the  Malayalam movie Big B (2007). Besides, Vakil has worked earlier as personal trainer for many Bollywood celebrities, including Kajol, Ajay Devgan and Sanjay Dutt.

Filmography

References

External links

Indian male film actors
Living people
Male actors in Hindi cinema
21st-century Indian male actors
Male actors from Mumbai
Indian bodybuilders
Year of birth missing (living people)